Exclusion principle may refer to:

 Exclusion principle (philosophy), epistemological principle
 In economics, the exclusion principle states "the owner of a private good may exclude others from use unless they pay."; it excludes those who are unwilling or unable to pay for the private good, but does not apply to public goods that are known to be indivisible: such goods need only to be available to obtain their benefits rather than purchased
 Pauli exclusion principle, quantum mechanical principle

See also
 Exclusionary rule, legal principle
 Inclusion–exclusion principle, in combinatorial mathematics